The 1995 Fed Cup was the 33rd edition of the most important competition between national teams in women's tennis, and the first to bear the name Fed Cup.

Major changes to the tournament's structure went into effect for 1995.  The format was changed to a multi-tiered league system similar to the Davis Cup, and a Group II was added to the existing Group I at Zonal level. The World Group I was reduced to eight teams and the World Group II was added with another eight teams.

Ties were played at home sites rather than all in one location as before. Play-offs determined promotion and relegation between World Group and World Group II and Zonal Group I. Two singles rubbers were added to the ties, which became the best of five matches.

The final took place on 25–26 November, with Spain defeating the United States to give Spain their third title.

World Group

Draw

World Group play-offs

The four losing teams in the World Group first round ties (Austria, Bulgaria, Japan and South Africa), and four winners of the World Group II ties (Argentina, Australia, Canada and Netherlands) entered the draw for the World Group play-offs.

Date: 22–23 July

World Group II

The World Group II was the second highest level of Fed Cup competition in 1995. Winners advanced to the World Group play-offs, and loser played in the World Group II play-offs.

Date: 22–23 April

World Group II play-offs

The four losing teams from World Group II (Indonesia, Italy, Slovakia and Sweden) played off against qualifiers from Zonal Group I. Two teams qualified from Europe/Africa Zone (Belgium and Czech Republic), one team from the Asia/Oceania Zone (South Korea), and one team from the Americas Zone (Paraguay).

Date: 22–23 July

Americas Zone

 Nations in bold advanced to the higher level of competition.
 Nations in italics were relegated down to a lower level of competition.

Group I 
Venue: Caracos Sports Club, Caracas, Venezuela (outdoor hard)

Dates: 11–15 April

Participating Teams

Group II
Venue: Trinidad C.C., Maraval, Port of Spain, Trinidad and Tobago (outdoor hard)

Dates: 27–30 March

Participating Teams

Asia/Oceania Zone

 Nations in bold advanced to the higher level of competition.
 Nations in italics were relegated down to a lower level of competition.

Group I
Venue: Jang Choong Tennis Centre, Jung-gu, South Korea (outdoor clay)

Dates: 18–22 April

Participating Teams

Group II
Venue: Maharashtra L.T.A., Mumbai, India (outdoor clay)

Dates: 8–11 March

Participating Teams

 
 
  Pacific Oceania

Europe/Africa Zone

 Nations in bold advanced to the higher level of competition.
 Nations in italics were relegated down to a lower level of competition.

Group I
Venue: La Manga Club, Murcia, Spain (outdoor clay)

Dates: 17–21 April

Participating Teams

Group II
Venue: Nairobi Club, Nairobi, Kenya (outdoor clay)

Dates: 8–13 May

Participating Teams

External links 
 Fed Cup

 
Billie Jean King Cups by year
Fed Cup
1995 in women's tennis